Kulen Mountain is a projecting-type mountain on the northwest side of Jøkulskarvet Ridge, in the Borg Massif of Queen Maud Land, Antarctica. It was mapped and named by Norwegian cartographers from surveys and air photos by the Norwegian–British–Swedish Antarctic Expedition (1949–52).

References

Mountains of Queen Maud Land
Princess Martha Coast